Gangleri may refer to:
 one of Odin's many nicknames meaning "the wanderer" or "Wayweary"
 the name of the ancient Swedish king Gylfi, given while in disguise, as described in the book Gylfaginning collected in the Prose Edda
 the name of the Icelandic magazine Gangleri, tímarit, an organ of the Theosophical Society in Iceland.